Achmad Sodiki was the second Deputy Chief Justice of the Constitutional Court of Indonesia. He is also a professor of law at University of Brawijaya, specializing in agrarian law.

At the end of Sodiki's term on the Constitutional Court of Indonesia, former President Susilo Bambang Yudhoyono attempted to replace him with Patrialis Akbar, though the Jakarta State Administrative Court blocked the appointment.

References

Justices of the Constitutional Court of Indonesia
21st-century Indonesian judges
Living people
Year of birth missing (living people)
Academic staff of the University of Brawijaya